Reunited is a 2009 studio album by British pop singer Cliff Richard and his original backing band the Shadows. The album celebrates the 50th anniversary of Cliff's first recordings and performances with The Shadows, and is their first studio collaboration for forty years. It features re-recordings of their hits from the late 1950s and early 1960s, plus three rock and roll era songs not previously recorded by them; "C'mon Everybody", "Sea Cruise" and the album's only single "Singing the Blues".

It is Richard's 32nd studio album and 70th album release overall. It is also the Shadows' 73rd album release overall and features Hank Marvin, Bruce Welch and Brian Bennett.

Track listing
 I Could Easily Fall (In Love with You) (Hank Marvin, Bruce Welch, John Rostill, Brian Bennett)
 The Young Ones (Sid Tepper, Roy C. Bennett)
 Move It (Ian Samwell)
 Living Doll (Lionel Bart)
 Bachelor Boy (Bruce Welch, Cliff Richard))
 Nine Times Out of Ten (Blackwell)
 C'mon Everybody (Eddie Cochran)
 Travellin' Light (Sid Tepper, Roy C. Bennett)
 It'll Be Me (Jack Clement)
 In the Country (Marvin, Welch, Rostill, Bennett)
 On the Beach (Marvin, Welch, Richard)
 The Next Time (Buddy Kaye)
 Please Don't Tease (Bruce Welch, Peter Chester)
 Sea Cruise (Huey "Piano" Smith)
 Willie and the Hand Jive (Johnny Otis)
 Summer Holiday (Bruce Welch, Brian Bennett)
 Do You Wanna Dance? (Bobby Freeman)
 Don't Talk to Him (Bruce Welch, Cliff Richard)
 Time Drags By (Marvin, Welch, Rostill, Bennett)
 Gee Whizz It's You (Hank Marvin, Pete Chester)
 Lucky Lips (Leiber and Stoller)
 Singing the Blues *single (Melvin Endsley)

The limited edition 2-CD set also includes:
 I'm the Lonely One (Gordon Mills)
 A Girl Like You (Jerry Lordan)
 I Love You (Bruce Welch)

Personnel
Cliff Richard – vocals
Hank Marvin – lead guitar
Bruce Welch – rhythm guitar
Brian Bennett – drums & percussion
Warren Bennett – keyboards
Mark Griffiths – bass guitar
Produced & Arranged By Warren & Brian Bennett

Charts and certifications

Charts

Year-end charts

Certifications

References 

Cliff Richard albums
The Shadows albums
EMI Records albums
2009 albums
British rock-and-roll albums